Mundee is a surname. Notable people with the surname include:

Brian Mundee (born 1964), English footballer
Denny Mundee (born 1968), English footballer
Fred Mundee (1913–1990), American football player